060 may refer to:
 Motorola 68060 microprocessor
 0-6-0, wheel arrangement for railway locomotives
 emergency telephone number in Mexico, "060"
 Bermuda, country code "060" (ISO 3166-1 numeric)
 060, the area code for Chimay in the Belgian telephone numbering plan